Ten Mile Lake is a lake located in north central Minnesota, United States. It is directly south of  Walker and northwest of Hackensack. It is spring fed and is the deepest natural lake enclosed in Minnesota's borders. It is known for its especially clear and clean water, due to the fresh spring sources.

Ten Mile Lake was named for its distance,  from the Indian agency on the Leech Lake Indian Reservation.

Neighboring lakes include Portage Lake to the north, and Birch Lake to the south. Ten Mile Lake is also the headwaters of the Boy River, which flows downstream through Boy Lake, Woman Lake, and eventually into the Leech Lake River and finally the Mississippi River. This is a popular canoe and kayak route, since there are not many portages, and it can be done in just a few days.

Most of the property around Ten Mile Lake is owned privately, but several resorts offer visitors a place to stay for short vacations.

Invasive Species
Despite efforts to prevent the spread of invasive species from other freshwater bodies in the Great Lakes area, zebra mussel larvae were found in Ten Mile Lake in October 2019.

Residents are also taking precautions to prevent the spread of spiny waterflea to Ten Mile Lake, which have affected the ecosystems of other freshwater bodies in the Great Lakes area.

See also
List of lakes in Minnesota

References

External links
DNR Ten Mile Lake info
Ten Mile Lake Association

Lakes of Cass County, Minnesota
Lakes of Minnesota